Creezy is a 1974 French film directed by Pierre Granier-Deferre and starring Alain Delon. It is based on the novel Creezy by Félicien Marceau.

It recorded admissions of 801,704 at the French box office.

Plot
Julien Dandieu is a senior figure in the Unified Republican Party (PRU), which has a chance of political power in a conservative coalition after the forthcoming election. His wife and son need his support but his political ambitions come first. Then he and a beautiful model, the "Creezy" (= "crazy") of the title, fall in love, and she wants to come first in his attentions. After badgering his best friend into abandoning his ideals to support him, he is elected and rewarded with his longed-for ministry, but at the moment of triumph he must choose between keeping an appointment with her and attending a formal ceremony. He chooses the latter, and when he finds her she has killed herself.

Cast
Alain Delon as Julien Dandieu
Sydne Rome as  Creezy
Jeanne Moreau as  Renee Vibert
Claude Rich as  Dominique
Jean-Marc Bory as Savarin
Jean-Pierre Castaldi as  Collard
Louis Seigner as  Garcin 
 Madeleine Ozeray  as Madame Dandieu

References

External links

1974 films
French drama films
Films directed by Pierre Granier-Deferre
Films based on French novels
Films about politicians
Adultery in films
Films scored by Philippe Sarde
1970s French-language films
1970s French films